Herbert Leslie Gell (12 August 1886 – 12 May 1938) was an  Australian rules footballer who played with Geelong in the Victorian Football League (VFL).

References

External links 

1886 births
1938 deaths
Australian rules footballers from Victoria (Australia)
Geelong Football Club players